"Down with the Trumpets" is the second official single released by British hip hop duo Rizzle Kicks, from their debut studio album, Stereo Typical. The single was released on 10 June 2011 in the United Kingdom. The song peaked at number eight on the UK Singles Chart and number twenty-nine on the Irish Singles Chart. It features Jack Birchwood on trumpet. A music video to accompany the release of "Down with the Trumpets" was uploaded to YouTube on 26 May 2011, at a total length of three minutes and twenty-four seconds. It features the duo being chased after causing trouble along the seaside of Hove. The duo performed the song live for the first time on T4 on 3 June 2011. An instrumental version of the song was used for Match of the Day 2's Goal of the Month feature for the 2011–12 Premier League season as well as the Goal of the Season feature on the final Match of the Day of the season.

Music video
The music video features Rizzle Kicks playing trumpets and frequently falling over and landing on the floor (in reference to the 'get down' lyric). Also, there are shots of Rizzle Kicks singing on Hove Lawns and seafront – this is the scene when member Jordan Stephens says the line 'I got grass stains on my brand new white trainers'. Also, Rizzle Kicks's mentor, Tom Hines, makes an appearance.

Track listing

Chart performance

Weekly charts

Year-end charts

Release history

References

Songs about trumpets
2011 singles
Island Records singles
Rizzle Kicks songs
2011 songs
Songs written by Iyiola Babalola